The Old Oak Blues is a Croatian film directed by Branko Schmidt and written by Goran Tribuson. It was released in 2000.

External links
 

2000 films
Croatian comedy films
2000s Croatian-language films
Films directed by Branko Schmidt
2000 comedy films